"The Voice" is a song by Irish singer Eimear Quinn that was the winner of the Eurovision Song Contest 1996, representing . The music was composed, and the lyrics were written, by Brendan Graham, who had also written and composed "Rock 'n' Roll Kids", the Irish winner from the 1994 contest. The victory, which was Ireland's fourth in five years, was their seventh (and to date last) contest victory, which remains a record for the most contests won by a single country.

History
Brendan Graham had originally submitted "The Voice" for consideration to represent Ireland in Eurovision 1996 via a recording made by the neo-traditional Celtic band Dervish. However, after "The Voice" had been advanced to the final for the Irish national round for Eurovision 1996, known as The National Song Contest, Graham attended a performance by the Anúna chorale at Christ Church Cathedral in Dublin, where he was struck by the voice of Anúna member Eimear Quinn. Graham was, indeed, so struck by her voice that he recruited Quinn to perform "The Voice" on the final of the National Song Contest held at the Point Theatre in Dublin on 6 March 1996: of the eight songs in the final, "The Voice" was the clear winner, with the participating ten regional juries awarding the song 105 points, 21 more points than the runner-up.

Eurovision 1996 featured a pre-qualifying round in which audio tapes of each nation's Eurovision 1996 entrant were sent to juries in each of the twenty-nine nations who had submitted Eurovision 1996 entrants: from these tapes, each jury deemed ten songs worthy of competing in Eurovision 1996 and the resultant tally allowed only twenty-two of the prospective entrants to advance to the Eurovision 1996 final to compete with the Norwegian entrant for Eurovision 1996: "I evighet" by Elisabeth Andreassen (fast-tracked to the Eurovision 1996 final by virtue of Norway having won Eurovision 1995 with "Nocturne" by Secret Garden). "The Voice" was the second highest vote getter in this pre-qualifying round its 198-point tally being bested only by 's "Den vilda" by One More Time whose point tally was 227. The specific placings in the pre-qualifying round were confidential and only leaked some time after the Eurovision 1996 final: however "The Voice" was viewed as a strong contender going into the final for Eurovision 1996 with a Top 5 placing predicted.

Quinn performed "The Voice" seventeenth on the night of the Eurovision final, following 's Lisa del Bo with "Liefde is een kaartspel" and preceding 's Jasmine with "Niin kaunis on taivas". "The Voice" placed first in a field of 23 with 162 points, easily besting both "I evighet" and "Den vilda" whose tallies of 114 and 100 points earned Eurovision 1996 final placings of respectively second- and third-place.
The jury decision at the 1996 contest was greeted with dismay amongst the public opinion of the audience, which began to leave the arena once the count had become a foregone conclusion. As a result of the differences between public and jury opinion, partial televoting was introduced for the following year's contest.

"The Voice" reached number three in Ireland but failed to become a major international hit with its only other evident top ten showing being in Belgium, where it reached number nine on the Dutch region charts. "The Voice" also charted in the Netherlands at number 21, on Belgium's French region charts at number 30, in Sweden at number 31 and in the UK at number 40.

Content
Lyrically, "The Voice" is a very Celtic-inspired song, with the singer portraying herself as "the voice" which watches over the world, describing "her" effects on the elements, such as the wind, the seasons, in a similar way to Mother Nature. It is of a folk style and is sung at a very high pitch. Quinn was accompanied by traditional Irish percussion, woodwind and string instruments.

Charts

Weekly charts

Year-end charts

Other versions 
Beginning in 2006 and 2007 with A New Journey, "The Voice" became a staple of the repertoire of Celtic Woman. Lisa Kelly, one of its members at the time, originated its version and then Susan McFadden took this melody.

References

External links
 
 Lyrics from the Diggiloo Thrush

Eurovision songs of Ireland
Eurovision songs of 1996
Eurovision Song Contest winning songs
1996 songs
Songs written by Brendan Graham
CNR Music singles
1996 singles